Anwar Iqbal Baloch (December 25, 1949 – July 1, 2021) was a Pakistani television actor and director, who achieved fame with the hit Pakistani drama series "Shama." Afterwards he went to star in "Akhri Chattan" (آخری چٹان) by Naseem Hijazi in the early 1980s. He was credited with the production of the first Balochi feature film, Hammal o Mahganj in Pakistan.

Early life
Iqbal is the son of a well-known politician from Balochistan, Mr. Haji Muhammed Iqbal Baloch, who played prominent role in the independence of Pakistan as well as in highlighting the importance of "Gawadar" port to the Pakistani government. He graduated with Master's degree from University of Karachi and subsequently started pursuing his career in acting and theatre.

Career
He began his career in 1976 with the production of "Hammal o Mahganj" which he also acted in. He then went on to produce the Sindhi drama "Dosten jo Piar" three years later. Despite working in plenty of series, his actual breakthrough was with the popular family drama series Shama, which became an immediate success and household name throughout the nation in the late 1970s and early 1980s and is still loved by many even now. He cited his initial success on the silver screen as a result of encouragement by the famous Pakistani writer Fatima Surayya Bajia and veteran director and producer Qasim Jalali. He rapidly emerged as a prominent actor with his memorable role in Shama as "Nana ki Jan Qamru (The beloved grandson of Qamar)". His debut as a director began with the Drama "Ishq Pecha" in 1984. Since then, he has acted in countless Urdu and Sindhi dramas and directed a few. He was also a popular teacher, teaching at a private school and working with a private TV channel.

He was particularly noted for his historical roles, by not only the public but also veteran PTV director Agha Nasir for his impressive  portrayal of "Shiwani Khan (Muhammad Shaybani" in the PTV Series "Babur" (life story of the first Mogul emperor Babur).

Death
Iqbal was diabetic and also battling with cancer. He died on July 1, 2021 and his funeral prayers were offered at Baitul Mukarram mosque in Gulshan-i-Iqbal after Isha prayers. He was laid to rest at the Mewa Shah graveyard, Karachi.

Filmography

Film
 Hammal O Mahganj

Television

References

1949 births
2021 deaths
Pakistani male television actors
Baloch people
University of Karachi alumni
Male actors from Karachi
20th-century Pakistani male actors
21st-century Pakistani male actors